Belarus competed at the 2019 World Aquatics Championships in Gwangju, South Korea from 12 to 28 July.

Artistic swimming

Belarus' artistic swimming team consisted of 11 athletes (11 female).

Women

 Legend: (R) = Reserve Athlete

Diving

Belarus entered two divers.

Men

Women

High diving

Belarus qualified one female high diver.

Swimming

Belarus entered seven swimmers.

Men

Women

Mixed

References

World Aquatics Championships
2019
Nations at the 2019 World Aquatics Championships